Herbert Thomas Friend (6 July 1888 – 13 March 1954) was an Australian rules footballer who played with Melbourne and St Kilda in the Victorian Football League (VFL).

Notes

External links 

 

1888 births
1954 deaths
Australian rules footballers from Melbourne
Melbourne Football Club players
St Kilda Football Club players
People from South Melbourne